is a passenger railway station located in the city of Nishinomiya, Hyōgo Prefecture, Japan. It is operated by the West Japan Railway Company (JR West).  As a part of the JR West Urban Network, the following cards are accepted: J-Thru Card, ICOCA, Suica, Pasmo, and PiTaPa.

Name
From 1874, when passenger service began at Nishinomiya Station, the station's name was written "西ノ宮", and included the katakana character "ノ" (no), which was not part of the city's name (西宮), to indicate the correct pronunciation of the station name. For many years, the city had requested for the character "ノ" to be removed from the station's title to match the city's name.  On March 18, 2007, in coordination with the opening of Sakura Shukugawa Station, the station's Japanese name was renamed to simply 西宮駅 without the character "ノ".

Lines

Layout and design

Station Placement
The section of the JR Kobe Line on which Nishinomiya is located runs on four tracks, meaning that there are two tracks for each direction.  Similar to other nearby stations such as Sannomiya Station, Nishinomiya Station is of the island platform type, with two above-ground platforms which service four tracks.  The inner tracks, Nos. 2 and 3, are for Local and Rapid Service trains, which do stop at this station.  On the outside tracks, Tracks No. 1 and 4, Special Rapid Service and Limited Express trains pass through the station without stopping.

Gates
The station has two entrances that lead to an integrated ticket gate.  The entrances are located on the north and south sides of the station.  The gate is located one flight down from ground level.  After passing through the gate, a passenger must take the stairs, escalator or elevator up to the platform.

Ticket office
The station has a Midori-no-Madoguchi, the JR ticket office equipped with MARS terminals.  It is open everyday from 05:30 until 23:00.

Platforms
 
 

During rush hour, Track Nos. 1 and 4 are used for Rapid Service, while Local trains stop at Track Nos. 2 and 3.  This allows people to transfer quickly from Local to Rapid Service trains, and allows the Rapid Service trains to pass ahead of the Local trains, which operate on the same track, unlike the Special Rapid Service and Limited Express trains.  During the afternoon and night hours, when there is less traffic, Rapid Service trains stop at Track Nos. 2 and 3 only, and Track Nos. 1 and 4 are roped off as they used only for trains passing through this station without stopping.

Nishinomiya Station also has two short spurs that allow non-passenger trains (e.g. freight or maintenance) to stop and allow other traffic to pass.

Adjacent stations

History

Timeline
11 May 1874 - Station opens for passenger service with the name 西ノ宮駅 at the same time rail service begins between Osaka Station and Kobe Station.
15 November 1944 - Hanshin Mukogawa Line operating between Nishinomiya Station and Suzaki Station begins freight service.
1958 - Hanshin Mukogawa Line between Nishinomiya Station and Suzaki Station ceases operation.  Later, in 1970, the rail line was pulled up.
1 November 1986 - Freight handling ceases.
East of Nishinomiya Station is the Asahi Beer Nishinomiya Brewery and even further east is Sumitomo Cement Service Station.  There was a private line running to both of these places which handled freight.
1 April 1987 - With the breaking up of Japanese National Railways into separate individual business units, Nishinomiya Station began operating under the West Japan Railway Company.
1 December 2003 - Rapid Service trains begin continuous service to Nishinomiya Station.  Until this time, Rapid Service trains only stopped during morning and evening rush hour.
18 March 2007 - Station renamed 西宮駅 in coordination with the opening of Sakura Shukugawa Station.
March 2018 - Station numbering was introduced with Nishinomiya being assigned station number JR-A52.

Beginning
Originally built around Nishinomiya Jinja as an inn town for travelers going further west and for those going to the east and central parts of Japan, beginning in the Edo period, Nishinomiya flourished as an important trading port and fishing harbor, and because the population was large, a train station was placed there.  Originally, it is said, that a Katakana character "ノ" was inserted into the station's name in accordance with the policy of the government railway because people from Tokyo could not read the names correctly.  In the same way, a "ノ" was inserted to the name of JR Sannomiya Station (三ノ宮駅), which opened on the same day as Nishinomiya Station.  However, truth behind this is not clearly known.  The national railways later scrapped this naming method; for example, it named Nishinomiya Najio Station on the Fukuchiyama Line without a "ノ" in 1986.

Unlike Hanshin Electric Railway, which was built after the opening of JR Nishinomiya and ran directly between Osaka and Kobe, at the time passenger service began, JR Nishinomiya Station was built away from the city's center in a slightly agricultural area.  The rail that passed through divided the city north and south, it is said that this caused the flow of people to begin moving east and west.

Competitor stations
Later, after the construction of the Tōkaidō Main Line through to Kobe, Hanshin Electric Railway and Hankyu Railway each built their own lines connecting Osaka to Kobe.  In the same area as JR Nishinomiya Station, Hanshin Nishinomiya Station and Hankyū Nishinomiya-Kitaguchi Station were built, which decentralized rail service in Nishinomiya, and provided customers other rail service options.

In 1934, the government railways built Kōshienguchi Station adjacent to Nishinomiya Station. The number of passengers using Kōshienguchi Station quickly exceeded that of Nishinomiya Station.  During era of Japanese National Railways, that number was approximately double.

Rapid service
In 1957, a study was conducted to find a station that would be suitable as a Rapid Service stop. An argument unfolded between the adjacent Ashiya Station and Nishinomiya Station.  In the end, it was decided that Rapid Service trains running on the inner tracks of the four track line, the Local service tracks, would stop at Ashiya Station.  The Rapid Service trains operating on the two outer tracks would stop at Nishinomiya Station.  However, in 2003, it was decided that all Local and Rapid Service trains would stop at both stations.

With the area around the station quickly becoming developed, and with the aforementioned fact that all Rapid Service trains stop at Nishinomiya Station, the difference between the number of passengers using Nishinomiya Station and Kōshienguchi Station suddenly began shrinking.

Renaming
On March 18, 2007, in coordination with the beginning of passenger service at Sakura Shukugawa Station, at the request of the city, the station's Japanese name was renamed to simply 西宮駅 without the character "ノ", while the character "ノ" in the name of JR Sannomiya Station was retained.

Streetcar connection
From 1926 to 1975, on the Route 2, which passes in front of the station, there used to be an inner-city street car which shared the road with other vehicle traffic.

The closest street car stop to the Nishinomiya Station was named Nishinomiya Ekimae (西宮駅前).

Bus connection
After Hanshin Electric Railway ceased the street car service, the Amagasaki-Kobe Line of Hanshin Railway Bus replaced it.  At the south exit to the station, a roundabout was built, and the Nishinomiya Ekimae bus stop was moved to this location and renamed to Kokudō JR Nishinomiya Eki Mae (国道JR西宮駅前).  In addition, on the inside of the roundabout, another bus stop was established with the name JR Nishinomiya Ekimae (JR西宮駅前), allowing busses running in both directions to be able to line up outside the station at one place.  In either case, both bus stops were called Nishinomiya Ekimae (西宮駅前), without the "ノ" even during the time when the station name itself was written with it.

Passenger statistics
In fiscal 2020, the station was used by an average of 16,321 passengers daily

Surrounding area

Inside the Station
Daily-In

North Exit
FamilyMart
Nishinomiya Police Station
Nishinomiya Shinmei Post Office

South Exit
Route 2
FamilyMart
Frente Nishinomiya
Nishinomiya Ekimae Post Office
Nishinomiya Fire Station

Bus routes
Bus connections are available at the bus stops on both sides of the station.

North exit
Platform 1
Hankyu Bus
Hanshin Bus
 Nishinomiya-Kitaguchi Route for Nishinomiya-Kitaguchi
 Nishinomiya Yamate Loop for 
 Jūrinji Loop for Jūrinji
Platform 2
Hankyu Bus
 Nishinomiya City Route for Nishinomiya City Hall,  and Asanagicho
Hanshin Bus
 Nishinomiya-Kitaguchi Route, Nishinomiya Yamate Loop, Jūrinji Loop for 
Platform 3
Hankyu Bus
Platform 4
Hankyu Bus
Sakura Yamanami Bus for Nishinomiya-Kitaguchi

South exit
Airport Limousine
Hankyu Bus, Hanshin Bus, Osaka Airport Transport, Kansai Airport Transportation Enterprise, Nankai Bus
 for Kansai International Airport
Platform 2
Hanshin Bus
 Amagasaki Ashiya Route for 
 Nishinomiya Hamate Route for Nishinomiya-Kitaguchi
Platform 3
Hanshin Bus
 Nishinomiya Hamate Route for Hanshin Nishinomiya and Marina Park
 Amagasaki Ashiya Route for

References

External links

Ekikara - JR Nishinomiya Station 
JR Odekake - Nishinomiya Station 

Stations of West Japan Railway Company
Railway stations in Hyōgo Prefecture
Railway stations in Japan opened in 1874
Tōkaidō Main Line
JR Kobe Line
Nishinomiya